Crombie Settlement is a Canadian rural community in Victoria County, New Brunswick.

Overview

Some current residents of Crombie Settlement claim that the settlement was founded by a man named John Crombie, not to be confused the founder of Crombie, a clothing line. The area was once the site of several family-owned farms and the settlement's early period was characterised by extensive lumbering.

Crombie Settlement is situated along Highway 108 at the base of Geneau Mountain. Crombie Settlement is located between Blue Bell, Hazeldean and Sisson Ridge.

In the past two decades Crombie Settlement has been home to a number of small businesses, including two convenience stores (one operated by Sharon & Lance Deleavey and the other by Beatrice and Theo Gagnon), a former fast-food take out (or 'canteen', operated by Allan Green, Jr. and Deborah Green), and two autobodies (Green's Auto Body, operated by Henry John Green and another) which remain in operation today.

See also
List of communities in New Brunswick

References

Communities in Victoria County, New Brunswick